Barbara Dana Broccoli  (born June 18, 1960) is a British-American film and stage producer, best known internationally for her work on the James Bond film series. With her half-brother Michael G. Wilson, Broccoli controls the James Bond film franchise.

Early life and education 
Broccoli was born in Los Angeles, the daughter of the James Bond producer Albert R. "Cubby" Broccoli and actress Dana Wilson Broccoli (born Dana Natol). She was raised in London and attended Lady Eden's school in Kensington.

Broccoli graduated from Loyola Marymount University in Los Angeles, where she studied motion picture and television communications.

Career 
In 1995, her father Cubby Broccoli handed over control of Eon Productions, the production company responsible for the James Bond series of films, to Barbara and her half-brother Michael G. Wilson; they continue to run the company as of 2015.

She was appointed Officer of the Order of the British Empire (OBE) in the 2008 New Year Honours and Commander of the Order of the British Empire (CBE) in the 2022 New Year Honours for services to film, drama, philanthropy and skills.

She and Wilson received the David O. Selznick Achievement Award in Theatrical Motion Pictures in 2013.

In 2014, she was selected as a member of the jury for the 64th Berlin International Film Festival.

Broccoli became President of the National Youth Theatre after the success of their 60th Anniversary Diamond Gala at Shaftesbury Theatre in 2016.

James Bond series 
Broccoli started working in the Bond series at the age of 17, working in the publicity department of The Spy Who Loved Me (1977). Several years later, she served as an assistant director on Octopussy (1983). Soon afterward, she progressed to become an associate producer of the film The Living Daylights (1987).

Her most significant role has been as a producer of the Bond films starring Pierce Brosnan and later Daniel Craig.

Stage productions

Chitty Chitty Bang Bang 
Following her father's death in 1996, Broccoli worked with London theatre producer Michael Rose, to create the stage musical version of Chitty Chitty Bang Bang based on the 1968 musical film starring Dick Van Dyke and Sally Ann Howes. Broccoli rehired the original songwriters from the film to write the new material for the stage version. The Sherman Brothers wrote five new songs for the show which debuted on April 16, 2002. The show ran at the London Palladium, and was the longest-running and most financially successful show to have ever played there.

Chitty Chitty Bang Bang later transferred to Broadway, but was considered a failure, receiving poor reviews and playing just 319 performances, closing with the loss of a large proportion of the initial $15 million investment.  The musical has toured extensively in the UK and in Asia, with a revised version of the show touring the United States in 2008.

Chariots of Fire 
In 2012, during the festivities surrounding the 2012 Summer Olympics in London, Broccoli co-produced Chariots of Fire, the London stage adaptation of the 1981 film of the same title. Broccoli's involvement with Chariots of Fire extended back to 1980, when she introduced her friend Dodi Fayed to the screenplay; he later co-financed the film and became its executive producer. She co-produced the play along with Hugh Hudson, who directed the 1981 Oscar-winning film.

Other stage play productions 
 La Cava (2000)
 A Steady Rain (2007)
 Catwalk Confidential (2009)
 Once (2011)
 Strangers on a Train (2013)
 Love Letters (2014)
 Othello (2016)
 The Kid Stays in the Picture (2017)
 The Country Girls (2017)

Filmography

Assistant director 
Octopussy (1983)
A View to a Kill (1985)

Associate producer 
The Living Daylights (1987)
Licence to Kill (1989)

Producer 
GoldenEye (1995)
Tomorrow Never Dies (1997)
The World Is Not Enough (1999)
Die Another Day (2002)
Casino Royale (2006)
Quantum of Solace (2008)
Skyfall (2012)
Spectre (2015)
Film Stars Don't Die in Liverpool (2017)
Nancy (2018)
The Rhythm Section  (2020)
No Time to Die (2021)
Ear for Eye (2021)
Till (2022)

Awards and nominations

Personal life 
Broccoli married director and film producer Frederick M. Zollo in 1991, and they had one child. They later divorced.

References

External links 
 
 

1960 births
American expatriates in England
People of Calabrian descent
American film producers
American theatre managers and producers
Broccoli family
James Bond
Living people
Loyola Marymount University alumni
Commanders of the Order of the British Empire
British film producers
British theatre managers and producers
Naturalised citizens of the United Kingdom
BAFTA winners (people)
Sports Emmy Award winners
Tony Award winners